Brad Lazarowich (born August 4, 1962) is a Canadian former National Hockey League linesman and the current director of officiating and player safety for the British Columbia Hockey League.

Background 
Born in Vancouver, British Columbia, Lazarowich, has worked more than 2000 NHL games. He officiated three Stanley Cup Finals and the Memorial Cup. He also worked two World Cup of Hockey tournaments, and the 2014 Heritage Classic. On April 3, 2016, Lazarowich officiated the last regular NHL season game of his career at MTS Centre in Winnipeg, Manitoba, Canada. Lazarowich wore uniform number #86.

References

1962 births
Living people
Canadian ice hockey officials
National Hockey League officials
Ice hockey people from Vancouver